Blackwell Rum (marketed as Blackwell Black Gold Rum) is a Jamaican brand of rum.

History of the company 
The company was established by the Island Records founder Chris Blackwell and the advertising executive and entrepreneur Richard Kirshenbaum in 2008. Blackwell's son, Chris Blackwell Jr. is also closely involved in the enterprise. The rum is distilled and blended by J.Wray and Nephew and distributed throughout the Caribbean and in other markets, including North America and the UK.

Recipe and distillation process 
The blend developed by Blackwell and the master blender Joy Spence is based on a traditional recipe from the days when Blackwell's mother's family, the Lindo's, owned J. Wray and Nephew Ltd. and Appleton Estate.

Blackwell Rum is produced from Jamaican sugar cane, water and yeast to produce a blend between a traditional ‘heavy’ pot and a lighter column still rum. Once distilled, it is aged in American oak barrels.

Awards and recognition 
 Finalist, with 92/100 – Ultimate Spirits Challenge 2012.
 Gold Medal, with 94/100 – Beverage Testing Institute 2012.
 International Spirits Challenge 2012 - Silver Medal for Design; Bronze Medal for Tasting.
 Gold Medal – Global Rum Masters 2015.
 Gold Medal Gold/Dark Rum – Festival Rum Bahamas.

In popular culture 
Blackwell Rum appeared in the 2012 American comedy series Anger Management.

References

External links 
 Blackwell Rum website
 Review and Chris Blackwell interview on The Floating Rum Shack
Diffords Guide tasting notes

Food and drink companies established in 2008
Food and drink companies of Jamaica
Jamaican brands
Jamaican rum